M1903, meaning Model of 1903, can refer to a number of different pieces of equipment

M1903 Springfield rifle
FN Model 1903
Colt Model 1903 Pocket Hammer
Colt Model 1903 Pocket Hammerless
3-inch gun M1903
6-inch gun M1903

See also
 M03 (disambiguation)